Bring Me the Head of Light Entertainment is a comedy panel game show that aired on Channel 5 from 3 April 1997 to 1 November 2000.

External links
.
Bring Me the Head of Light Entertainment at BFI.
.

1990s British comedy television series
1990s British game shows
1997 British television series debuts
2000s British comedy television series
2000s British game shows
2000 British television series endings
British panel games
Channel 5 (British TV channel) original programming
Television shows produced by Anglia Television
Television series by ITV Studios